Laurens Sweeck (born 17 December 1993) is a Belgian cyclo-cross and road cyclist, who currently rides for UCI Continental team . He represented his nation in the men's elite event at the 2016 UCI Cyclo-cross World Championships  in Heusden-Zolder.

Sweeck is the grandson of former cyclist Alfons Sweeck. His twin brother Diether Sweeck and his older brother Hendrick Sweeck are also professional cyclists.

Major results

Road
2017
 1st Grote Prijs Jean-Pierre Monseré
 10th Halle–Ingooigem
2022
 5th Heistse Pijl

Cyclo-cross

2014–2015
 1st  National Under-23 Championships
 2nd Overall Under-23 Superprestige
1st Ruddervoorde
1st Hoogstraten
1st Middelkerke
2nd Gieten
3rd Zonhoven
3rd Gavere
 2nd Overall UCI Under-23 World Cup
1st Heusden-Zolder
1st Hoogerheide
3rd Namur
 2nd  UCI World Under-23 Championships
 2nd  UEC European Under-23 Championships
 2nd Antwerpen
 2nd Maldegem
 2nd Mol
 2nd Under-23 Hasselt
 3rd Oostmalle
2015–2016
 BPost Bank Trophy
1st Sint-Niklaas
 EKZ CrossTour
1st Baden
 2nd National Championships
 3rd Mol
 3rd Neerpelt
2016–2017
 Soudal Classics
1st Hasselt
1st Neerpelt
3rd Leuven
 UCI World Cup
2nd Heusden-Zolder
3rd Las Vegas
3rd Iowa City
 Brico Cross
2nd Bredene
 3rd Overall Superprestige
3rd Gieten
3rd Zonhoven
3rd Ruddervoorde
3rd Middelkerke
 DVV Trophy
3rd Hamme
 3rd National Championships
 3rd Otegem
2017–2018
 Brico Cross
1st Maldegem
2nd Hulst
 Soudal Classics
 1st Neerpelt
2nd Niel
 1st Iowa City
 1st Las Vegas
 UCI World Cup
2nd Heusden-Zolder
3rd Iowa City
 DVV Trophy
2nd Essen
3rd Lille
3rd Antwerpen
 3rd Overall Superprestige
2nd Boom
2nd Hoogstraten
3rd Gieten
3rd Diegem
 2nd National Championships
 2nd Oostmalle
2018–2019
 Brico Cross
1st Essen
2nd Lokeren
 1st Neerpelt
 3rd  UEC European Championships
 UCI World Cup
3rd Waterloo
 DVV Trophy
3rd Niel
3rd Hamme
3rd Baal
2019–2020
 1st  National Championships
 1st Overall Superprestige
1st Middelkerke
2nd Ruddervoorde
2nd Zonhoven
3rd Gavere
 Ethias Cross
1st Eeklo
2nd Essen
 Rectavit Series
1st Neerpelt
2nd Niel
 1st Waterloo
 1st Oostmalle
 UCI World Cup
2nd Koksijde
2nd Heusden-Zolder
3rd Nommay
 DVV Trophy
2nd Hamme
 3rd  UEC European Championships
2020–2021
 Superprestige
1st Niel
1st Middelkerke
3rd Gieten
3rd Merksplas
 Ethias Cross
1st Leuven
2nd Kruibeke
3rd Lokeren
 X²O Badkamers Trophy
1st Lille
3rd Hamme
 1st Oostmalle
 2nd Mol
2021–2022
 X²O Badkamers Trophy
1st Hamme
 Ethias Cross
1st Leuven
1st Maldegem
2nd Bredene
2nd Meulebeke
 1st Oostmalle
 1st Ardooie
 UCI World Cup
2nd Koksijde
 2nd National Championships
 Superprestige
3rd Merksplas
2022–2023
 1st  Overall UCI World Cup
1st Maasmechelen
1st Beekse Bergen
2nd Waterloo
2nd Fayetteville
2nd Hulst
2nd Dublin
2nd Besançon
3rd Zonhoven
 Superprestige
1st Niel
1st Merksplas
2nd Ruddervoorde
3rd Middelkerke
 X²O Badkamers Trophy
1st Lille
3rd Koksijde
 Exact Cross
1st Sint Niklaas
3rd Kruibeke
 1st Otegem
 1st Oostmalle
 2nd National Championships
 2nd Maldegem
 3rd  Team relay, UCI World Championships
 3rd  UEC European Championships
 3rd Ardooie

References

External links

1993 births
Living people
Cyclo-cross cyclists
Belgian male cyclists
Belgian cyclo-cross champions
Cyclists at the 2010 Summer Youth Olympics
Sportspeople from Leuven
Cyclists from Flemish Brabant
Twin sportspeople
Belgian twins